The 2022–23 Michigan State Spartans men's ice hockey season is the 82nd season of play. They represent Michigan State University in the 2022–23 NCAA Division I men's ice hockey season. This season marks the program and 33rd in the Big Ten Conference. They play their home games at Munn Ice Arena and are coached by Adam Nightingale, in his first season.

Season
During the game against Ohio State on November 11, Kamil Sadlocha was given a game misconduct for yelling a racial slur at Jagger Joshua. The Big Ten supported the match penalty but, due to a lack of incontrovertible evidence, would not add any additional punishment. Because of the lack of action from either Ohio State or the Big Ten, Joshua went public with the incident a week later. Though Jagger did not name the offending player, Sadlocha was the only one to receive a match penalty in the game. After the full account of the incident was reported, the Ohio State athletic department sent Sadlocha home for an indeterminate time.

Departures

Recruiting

Roster
As of July 11, 2022.

Standings

Schedule and results

|-
!colspan=12 style=";" | Exhibition

|-
!colspan=12 style=";" | Regular Season

|-
!colspan=12 style=";" | 

|-
!colspan=12 style=";" | Regular Season

|-
!colspan=12 style=";" |

Scoring statistics

Goaltending statistics

Rankings

USCHO did not release a poll in weeks 1 and 13.

References

External links

2022-23
Michigan State Spartans
Michigan State Spartans
Michigan State Spartans
Michigan State Spartans